The following is a discography of singles and albums recorded by American singer Frankie Laine.

Studio albums 
Labels and catalog numbers refer to the release in the US. Exceptions include Philips, Hallmark, Polydor, Embassy and Warwick, released in the UK and not the US. Albums not released in the US or UK have not been included. Where there is a mono and stereo release, both catalog numbers are shown.

Mercury years 
The Mercury 1949–1952 long-playing records (LPs) were 10" diameter. They mainly just compiled songs already available as 78-r.p.m. sides, but that was common practice at the time, so all of them are listed here as regular albums and not as compilations, regardless whether they contain some previously unreleased material or not.

Columbia years

Capitol years

ABC years

Amos years

Polydor, etc. years

Compilation albums

Singles 
Accompanying vocalists are shown with each song where applicable. Otherwise, accompanying orchestra, chorus and any other details are shown in footnotes. Not included are re-releases (unless they charted higher than the original release) and records that were not released in the US or UK, unless they charted in the countries below. David Kent's Australian retrospective charts only start weekly in 1950. Belgium's Ultratop Flanders chart began in December 1954. The UK chart began in November 1952. The US Billboard Easy Listening (Adult Contemporary) chart began in January 1961.

Notes

References 

Laine, Frankie

Pop music discographies